Witchcraft Rebellion is a studio album by American band Old Time Relijun. It was released on April 24, 2001, by K Records.

Track listing

Personnel
 Arrington de Dionyso – electric guitar, vocals and bass clarinet
 Phil Elvrum – drums
 Aaron Hartman – stand up bass

References

External links
Old Time Relijun official website
 Review by Popmatters.com

2001 albums
K Records albums
Old Time Relijun albums